Zebastian is a given name. Notable people with the name include:

 Zebastian Lucky Luisi (born 1984), New Zealand rugby league footballer
 Zebastian Modin (born 1994), Swedish skier and biathlete

See also
 Sebastian (name)
 

Masculine given names